Bishop Watterson High School is a parochial, college preparatory high school located in Columbus, Ohio.

History

Bishop Watterson High School, founded in 1954 under the auspices of the Diocese of Columbus, is a co-educational college preparatory institution serving the Central Ohio area.  Bishop Watterson High School was the first co-educational diocesan high school in Franklin County.  It opened its doors in the fall of 1954 in honor of Bishop John Ambrose Watterson, the second Bishop of Columbus who served until April 17, 1899.

Athletics
Sports that are offered include baseball, basketball, bowling, cross country, diving, field hockey, football, ice hockey, golf, lacrosse, soccer, softball, swimming, tennis, track and field, volleyball and wrestling.  in 2019, Bishop Watterson began playing its home football games at Ohio Dominican University.

Ohio High School Athletic Association State Championships

 Boys' Basketball - 2013 
 Golf - 1972, 1973, 1974, 1976, 2004 
 Baseball - 1988, 1991, 1997 
 Girls' Field Hockey - 1995, 2005, 2009, 2020, 2021 
 Football – 1966, 1973, 2002, 2010

Notable alumni

Jorge Aguirre (author) - author and children's television show producer
Mike Durant - professional baseball player
John Krimm - professional football player
Erin McDougald - jazz vocalist 
Sacha Pfeiffer - Pulitzer-Prize winning journalist
Kyle Reifers - professional golfer
Tim Timmons - MLB Umpire
Al Washington - football coach

Notes and references

External links
Bishop Watterson High School Official Website
Watterson Girls Soccer Website
Watterson Swimming and Diving Website

Roman Catholic Diocese of Columbus
High schools in Columbus, Ohio
Catholic secondary schools in Ohio
Educational institutions established in 1954
1954 establishments in Ohio